Pirqasqa (Quechua pirqa wall, -sqa a suffix, "stonewalled", hispanicized spelling Perjasja) is a mountain in the Wansu mountain range in the Andes of Peru, about  high. It is situated in the Arequipa Region, La Unión Province, in the northern part of the Puyca District. It lies south of Qullpa K'uchu, west of Kunturillu and southeast of Minasniyuq. The little lake east of Pirqasqa is named Pirqasqaqucha (Perjasjacocha).

The Kunturillu River (Condorillo) originates northwest of the mountain. It flows to the southeast as a right tributary of the Uqururu (Aymara and Quechua for Mimulus glabratus, hispanicized Ojoruro). The river is also known as Sumana or Cotahuasi. It flows to the Cotahuasi Canyon in the southwest.

References 

Mountains of Peru
Mountains of Arequipa Region